Adam G. Sevani (born June 29, 1992) is an Armenian-American actor and dancer, known for playing Robert "Moose" Alexander III in the Step Up film series.

Acting career
In February 2008, Sevani appeared in the Touchstone Pictures dance drama film Step Up 2: The Streets, the second installment of the Step Up film series. The film centered on a group of students who form a dance troupe and battle on the streets. Sevani's performance as Robert "Moose" Alexander III was praised by critics, such as The New York Times, for portraying a character who "might be the baddest nerd in movie history". The film, which received generally mixed reviews, went on to gross over $150 million worldwide. For his role in the film, Sevani received the "Best Scene Stealer" award at the 2008 Young Hollywood Awards.
In May 2009 Sevani was confirmed to reprise the role of Moose in the third installment of the Step Up series. Filming took place in New York City on a $30 million budget. The film, Step Up 3D, centers on Moose and his best friend Camille Alyson Stoner moving to New York to start University until Sevani's character gets mixed up in the underground dance scene. The film was released in August 2010 to generally mixed reviews from critics. As of August 2012, the film is the highest grossing installment of the franchise, with over $159 million worldwide. In July 2012, Sevani made a small appearance in the series' fourth installment, Step Up Revolution. In 2014, Sevani once again reprised his role as Moose in the fifth installment of the Step Up film series, Step Up: All In.

In August 2010, Sevani was confirmed to star in the American remake of the 2008 French film LOL (Laughing Out Loud), alongside Miley Cyrus, Demi Moore and Ashley Greene. The film centers on Cyrus's character finishing her final year of high school. In May 2012, the film received a limited US release, and was given bad reviews from critics.

Dancing
Sevani has appeared in music videos such as: Mase's "Breathe, Stretch, Shake", Will Smith's "Switch", T-Pain's "Church" and a little part in NLT's "That Girl." He also did the choreography for NLT's music video for "Karma." He is credited as a back-up dancer for Kevin Federline's performance on the Teen Choice Awards in 2006. Adam also formed a dance crew with Jon Chu and several California area dancers with celebrity cameos in 2008 known as the AC/DC, or Adam/Chu Dance Crew. The crew had a highly publicized YouTube dance battle with Miley Cyrus. The battle ended with a final dance off between the two crews at the 2008 Teen Choice Awards. In November 2008, he was featured in a tribute video to Michael Jackson's 25th Anniversary 'Thriller' video, with Step Up series co-star Alyson Stoner.

Filmography

See also
 List of dancers

References

External links

1992 births
21st-century American male actors
American male child actors
American male dancers
American male film actors
American people of Armenian descent
American people of Italian descent
Living people
Male actors from Los Angeles